David Andrew Szott (born December 12, 1967) is a former professional American football offensive lineman.

Szott played 14 years in the National Football League for the Kansas City Chiefs, the Washington Redskins, and the New York Jets, before retiring from football in February 2004.  He remained with the Jets as an offensive line coach and in player development.  Szott became the team's chaplain in 2006.

Szott played college football at Penn State for legendary football coach Joe Paterno.

Szott grew up in Clifton, New Jersey, and was a standout player at Clifton High School in New Jersey.  He was also a standout high school wrestler in New Jersey placing fourth in the heavyweight division of the 1986 USA Wrestling Junior Freestyle Tournament.  Szott was undefeated until the round robin portion where he was pinned by eventual champion John Matyiko of Virginia.  Szott then was pinned by Carl Presley of Illinois in the semi-finals and settled for fourth place while losing by fall to Jon Morris of Virginia.

Personal life
Szott and his wife, Andrea, have two children, the older, Shane, suffers from cerebral palsy.  He is a tireless fundraiser for charitable causes related to the disorder. Josh, the youngest is 20 years old and plays wide receiver for Colgate University.

References

External links
"NY Jets' Dave Szott Honored as 'Hometown Hero'", United Way Press Release, May 1, 2003

1967 births
Living people
American football offensive guards
Clifton High School (New Jersey) alumni
Kansas City Chiefs players
New York Jets players
New York Jets coaches
Penn State Nittany Lions football players
Sportspeople from Clifton, New Jersey
Sportspeople from Passaic, New Jersey
Washington Redskins players
Players of American football from New Jersey
Ed Block Courage Award recipients